John Edward Lambert (born January 14, 1953) is an American former professional basketball player born in Berkeley, California. In high school at Berkeley, he played basketball and was a member of The State Champs Berkeley High Yellowjackets, which included Glenn Burke, a professional baseball player. In 2007 he was inducted into the school's new Athletic Hall of Fame.

A 6'10" center from the University of Southern California, Lambert played in the National Basketball Association from 1975 to 1982. In the 1975 NBA draft, he was selected by the Cleveland Cavaliers as their first pick, and number 15 overall. He signed a multi-year contract in July 1975, and again in September 1979. In November 1980, Cleveland activated Lambert from the injured reserve list; he had been on the list since the beginning of the season, because of back spasms.

In December 1980, Cleveland placed Lambert on waivers; he became a free agent and was signed that month by the Kansas City Kings. In February 1982, Kansas City sent Lambert to the San Antonio Spurs for a third round draft selection in 1984, plus cash. In August 1982 he again was placed on waivers and became a free agent.

In his NBA career, Lambert averaged 3.8 points per game and 3.3 rebounds per game.

From 2001 to 2009, Lambert was a Principal with KCM Investment Advisors, where he focused on its high net worth and institutional business. He left in 2009 to join Neuberger Berman; in September 2010 he was promoted to the position of West Coast regional director for that company's wealth management business. Lambert left Neuberger Berman in 2014 and joined Morgan Stanley as the producing branch manager of their San Francisco, California office. He later moved his high net worth practice to Morgan Stanley's Santa Rosa, California office and retired in February 2021.  Morgan Stanley.

Notes

1953 births
Living people
American expatriate basketball people in Italy
American men's basketball players
Basketball players from Berkeley, California
Berkeley High School (Berkeley, California) alumni
Centers (basketball)
Cleveland Cavaliers draft picks
Cleveland Cavaliers players
Kansas City Kings players
Power forwards (basketball)
Reyer Venezia players
San Antonio Spurs players
USC Trojans men's basketball players